Robert Howard "Bob" Lewis (February 15, 1925 – March 27, 2015) was an American former politician in the state of Washington. He served the 5th district from 1973 to 1981. Lewis was in the savings and loan business. He also served on the Spokane City Council. Lewis died in Spokane, Washington on March 27, 2015.

References

1925 births
2015 deaths
Politicians from Spokane, Washington
Businesspeople from Spokane, Washington
Washington (state) city council members
Republican Party Washington (state) state senators
People from Deer Park, Washington
20th-century American businesspeople